John Dean Caton (March 19, 1812, Monroe, New YorkJuly 30, 1895) was an associate justice and chief justice of the Illinois Supreme Court.

Caton attended the Utica Academy in Utica, New York. After graduation, he worked as a teacher in Utica. During this period, Caton studied civil engineering and law. In 1833, Caton moved to Chicago, then a small town, and opened the first law office there with his partner, Giles Spring.

In his book, Early Bench and Bar of Illinois, inspired by an 1893 speech given to the Illinois Bar Association, Judge Caton claims to have tried the first jury case in a court of record in Cook County, Illinois. He recounts his experiences riding the circuit in the early days of Illinois statehood, and his later appointment to the Illinois Supreme Court, a period of some sixty years. He relates a number of humorous anecdotes about his days as a circuit rider.

Abraham Lincoln was an attorney in 214 cases in the Illinois Supreme Court in which Caton was a justice.

References

1812 births
1895 deaths
Chief Justices of the Illinois Supreme Court
19th-century American judges
Justices of the Illinois Supreme Court